Bassigbiri, also spelled Gbassigbiri, is a village located in Haut-Mbomou Prefecture, Central African Republic.

History 
On 25 February 2008, LRA militias led by Okot Odhiambo attacked Bassigbiri. They abducted 40 people and brought the hostages to LRA's camp in Garamba National Park. It is the first known LRA attack in the Central African Republic.

Around 15 July-1 August 2009, LRA raided Bassigbiri for the second time.

References 

Populated places in Haut-Mbomou